Attorney General v Jonathan Cape Ltd [1975] 3 All ER 484 is a UK constitutional law case, concerning the rule of law.

Facts
The Attorney General applied for an injunction to stop Jonathan Cape Ltd and the Sunday Times publishing the diaries of the late Richard Crossman, a Cabinet minister for Housing in the Labour Party under Harold Wilson around 1964. The diaries recorded cabinet discussions, and advice given by or about civil servants. The Secretary of the Cabinet heard about the upcoming publication, asked for the contents but could not agree with the publishers about what to redact. The Sunday Times did in fact publish extracts despite the objections. The Attorney General argued the doctrine of collective responsibility would be undermined if confidential discussions were open to the public.

Judgment

Lord Widgery LCJ held that there was no sufficient public interest in restraining disclosure because the events were 10 years before. The court does have the power to restrain disclosure of confidential information, to protect the doctrine of collective responsibility. But here there was no risk to future operation of collective responsibility that would inhibit free discussion in the Cabinet. There was no power, however, to restrain disclosure of advice given by civil servants or their opinions. He said the following:

Significance
The case established the principle that although conventions are not in and of themselves legally enforceable, they may give rise to legal obligations that the court may enforce.

Publication
The book collection The Diaries of a Cabinet Minister was published in 1976.

See also

United Kingdom constitutional law

References

United Kingdom constitutional case law